Théagène et Chariclée, originally spelt Théagène et Cariclée (Theagenes and Chariclea), is an opera by the French composer Henri Desmarets, first performed at the Académie Royale de Musique (the Paris Opera) on 12 April 1695. It takes the form of a tragédie en musique in a prologue and five acts. The libretto, by Duché de Vancy, is based on the ancient Greek novel Aethiopica by Heliodorus.

Sources
 Libretto at "Livres baroques"
 Félix Clément and Pierre Larousse Dictionnaire des Opéras, Paris, 1881, page 658.

External links
 

French-language operas
Tragédies en musique
Operas by Henri Desmarets
Operas
1695 operas